Behala Airport  is located at Behala in the city of Kolkata, India. It is more commonly called Behala Flying Training Institute or Behala Flying Club.

References

Airports in West Bengal
Buildings and structures in Kolkata
Transport in Kolkata
Year of establishment missing